is a 1973 novel by Toyoko Yamasaki. It has been adapted into a film in 1974 and then three times as a television series in 1974, 2007, and 2021.

Plot
Set in the post-World War II climate of the 1960s in Kobe, the show explores the struggle for power within the powerful Manpyo family. The ambitious Teppei seeks to expand operations of his company, and goes to his father to see if he can secure a loan. But the Minister of Finance seeks the merger of smaller Japanese banks to fend off foreign competition. Daisuke must decide whether to protect his son's interest in manufacturing or to ensure the survival of the bank that he controls.

The series mostly revolves on the hidden secrets within the Manpyo family. A running theme throughout the show is Teppei's constant hunger for his father's approval. However, instead of being seen as a son, he is often seen as a threat by his own father. Throughout most of the series, they are competing as Daisuke refuses to help in Teppei's struggles.

At the end, we are shown why the characters act as they did. Teppei's mother was supposedly raped by his grandfather, therefore, making Daisuke unsure if Teppei was actually his, or Keisuke's (his father). Teppei's uncanny resemblance to Keisuke, and his blood type proves to Daisuke that he was, indeed, his half-brother. This causes the heartache that surrounds the Manpyo family.

Teppei's company is not saved. As he finds out that he was not actually who he thought he was, he goes to the mountains where his family hunts. He makes a final call to his wife. The next morning, Teppei leaves a suicide note and shoots himself.

When the Manpyo family learns about Teppei's death, his mother is distraught. His father however, seems placid and cold. A man then comes in and asks the parents to sign Teppei's death certificate. Daisuke notices that they had made a mistake in the certificate, he states that they had Teppei's blood type wrong. The man informs them that the blood test was wrong. This revelation drives Teppei's mother into a fit. Daisuke is weakened. The man he thought to be a product of his father's horrible actions, was in fact, his own son. He is even more remorseful when he reads Teppei's suicide letter. Finally, Teppei is given the acceptance that he so long craved for.

Television production 1974

Cast
So Yamamura – Daisuke Manpyo
Mayumi Ogawa – Aiko Takasu / Narrator
Yoko Shimada – Tsugiko Manpyo
Yūzō Kayama – Teppei Manpyo
Yoshiko Kuga – Yasuko Manpyo
Ryūzō Hayashi – Ginpei Manpyo
Masako Izumi – Fusako
Yukiko Kashiwagi – Sanae Manpyo
Izumi Yamaguchi – Makiko Yasuda
Kei Satō – Ataru Mima
Utako Mitsuya – Ichiko Mima
Shinya Owada – Yoshihiko Ichinose
Ryō Ikebe – Shoichi Mikumo
Shiho Fujimura – Shiho Mikumo
Meichō Soganoya – Sentaro Watanuki
Ken Nishida – Kazuya Hosokawa
Kōji Kawamura – Ichiro Okawa
Masao Shimizu as Miyamoto
Kazuya Oguri – the factory head Ichinose
Kenji Sugawara – Hideyuki Akutagawa
Kyōsuke Maki – Zenitaka
Hideaki Nagai – Ōkame
Akihiko Hirata – Haruta
Kōichi Itō – the prime minister Sahashi
Isao Yamagata – the finance minister Nagata

Film

Karei-naru Ichizoku was released theatrically in Japan on 26 January 1974 where it was distributed by Toho. The film was commercially great successful.

Cast
Shin Saburi as Daisuke Manpyō
Tatsuya Nakadai as Teppei Manpyō / Keisuke Manpyō
Yumeji Tsukioka as Yasuko Manpyō 
Yūki Meguro as Ginpei Manpyō
Kyōko Kagawa as Ichiko Mima
Yoko Yamamoto as Sanae Manpyō
Wakako Sakai as Tsugiko Manpyō
Kin'ya Kitaōji as Yoshihiko Ichinose
Hideaki Nitani as Shōichi Mikumo
Eitaro Ozawa as the finance minister Nagata
Akiji Kobayashi as Kojima
Mizuho Suzuki as Kuraishi
Akihiko Hirata as Haruta
Shigeru Kōyama as Wajima
Tappei Shimokawa as Head of the Teikoku Seitetsu
Yoshio Inaba as the factory head Ichinose
Toshio Takahara as Tsunoda
Hideji Ōtaki as Arao
Nobuo Nakamura as Matsudaira
Osamu Takizawa as Miyamoto
Kō Nishimura as Watanuki
Takashi Shimura as Tahei Yasuda
Jirō Tamiya as Ataru Mima
Machiko Kyō as Aiko Takasu

Honors
Mainichi Film Award for Best Art Direction award
Mainichi Film Award for Best Cinematography award
In Kinema Junpo magazine's list of the 10 best Japanese films of the year, Karei-naru Ichizoku reached #3 in 1974.

Television production 2007

Cast
Takuya Kimura – Teppei Manpyo
Kin'ya Kitaōji – Daisuke Manpyo
Kyōka Suzuki – Aiko Takasu
Kazue Fukiishi – Ichiko Mima
Kyōko Hasegawa – Sanae Manpyo
Toru Nakamura – Ataru Mima
Hiroki Narimiya – Yoshihiko Ichinose
Toshiyuki Nishida – Ichiro Okawa
Masahiko Nishimura – Zenitaka
Tetsuya Takeda – Ōkame
Yu Yamada – Makiko Yasuda
Koji Yamamoto – Ginpei Manpyo
Toshirō Yanagiba – Shoichi Mikumo
Saki Aibu – Tsugiko Manpyo
Izumi Inamori – Fusako Tsuruta
Yumi Takigawa – Shino Tsuruta
Sei Hiraizumi – the factory head Ichinose
Masayuki Ito – Matsuo Tanaka
Shōfukutei Tsurube II – Sentaro Watanuki
Masahiko Tsugawa – the finance minister Nagata
Mieko Harada – Yasuko Manpyo

Ratings
The series attracted high ratings. Over the course of its run, the series averaged 23.9% in the Kanto region (TBS) and 30.4% in the Kansai region (MBS). The second half of the series' two-part "Finale" attained a rating of 30.4%, the highest rating achieved by a Japanese drama episode in 2007.

Hawaii broadcast
Karei-naru Ichizoku aired on KIKU-TV in Hawaii on September 23, 2007 to November 25, 2007 under the name The Grand Family.  The broadcast included complete English subtitles.

Television production 2021

Cast
Kiichi Nakai – Daisuke Manpyo
Osamu Mukai – Teppei Manpyo
Yuki Uchida – Aiko Takasu
Yumi Asō – Yasuko Manpyo
Taisuke Fujigaya – Ginpei Manpyo
Riho Yoshioka – Makiko Yasuda
Jun Kaname – Ataru Mima
Rie Mimura – Ichiko Mima
Honoka Matsumoto – Tsugiko Manpyo
Asuka Kudoh – Yoshihiko Ichinose
Rena Sasamoto – Sanae Manpyō
Riko Fukumoto – Mitsuko Manpyo
Toshiya Miyata – Kazuya Hosokawa
Ken Ishiguro – Shoichi Mikumo
Seiji Rokkaku – Sentaro Watanuki
Toshiyuki Nagashima – Ichiro Okawa
Masaya Kato – the factory head Ichinose
Masanobu Takashima – Hideyuki Akutagawa
Masahiro Kōmoto – Zenitaka
Hajime Inoue – Ōkame
Yoichi Nukumizu – Matsuo Tanaka
Hisako Manda – Tsuruko
Rena Tanaka – Fusako
Masatō Ibu – the prime minister Sahashi
Kōji Ishizaka (special appearance) – the finance minister Nagata

References

Japanese novels
Toho films
Films directed by Satsuo Yamamoto
Films scored by Masaru Sato
1970s Japanese films
1974 Japanese television series debuts
1975 Japanese television series endings
2007 in Japanese television
2007 Japanese television series debuts
2007 Japanese television series endings
2021 Japanese television series debuts
2021 Japanese television series endings
Japanese drama television series
Nichiyō Gekijō
Television shows based on Japanese novels
Television series set in the 1960s